Michal Izdinsky (born 23 July 1992) is a water polo player from France. He was part of the French team at the 2016 Summer Olympics, where the team was eliminated in the group stage.

References

French male water polo players
Living people
1992 births
Olympic water polo players of France
Water polo players at the 2016 Summer Olympics
Sportspeople from Bratislava
Slovak emigrants to France